Gérard Geisbusch (born 4 May 1988 in Luxembourg) is a Luxembourgian-Norwegian football midfielder, he plays for Luxembourg National Division side CS Fola Esch.

International career
Has played for the Luxembourg national football team twice.

References

External links

1988 births
Living people
Luxembourgian footballers
CS Fola Esch players
VfR Aalen players
Luxembourg international footballers
Association football midfielders